The 1952 Maryland State Hawks football team was an American football team that represented Maryland State College (now known as University of Maryland Eastern Shore) during the 1952 college football season. In their fifth season under head coach Vernon McCain, the team compiled a 9–1 record, shut out five of ten opponents, and outscored all opponents by a total of 257 to 52.

Schedule

References

Maryland State
Maryland Eastern Shore Hawks football seasons
Maryland State Hawks football